The 2013–14 Azadegan League was the 23rd season of the Azadegan League and 13th as the second highest division since its establishment in 1991. The season featured 17 teams from the 2012–13 Azadegan League, four new teams relegated from the 2012–13 Persian Gulf Cup: Aluminium Hormozgan, Sanat Naft, Paykan and Gahar Zagros and four new teams promoted from the 2012–13 2nd Division: Naft va Gaz Gachsaran and Siah Jamegan both as champions and Sanaye Giti Pasand and Albadr Bandar Kong. Padideh replaced Mes Sarcheshmeh. The league started on 22 September 2013 and ended on 8 April 2014. Padideh won the Azadegan League title for the first time in their history. Padideh, Naft Masjed Soleyman and Paykan promoted to the Persian Gulf Pro League.

Events

Start of season
The league was to feature four teams relegated from Iran Pro League in 2012–13; Aluminium Hormozgan, Sanat Naft, Paykan and Gahar Zagros.
It featured four teams promoted from 2012–13 2nd Division: Naft Gachsaran, Giti Pasand, Siah Jamegan, and Badr Hormozgan.

Changes
2013–14 Azadegan League are the first season since 2008 that 26 teams will participate in the competition. In the previous season, 28 teams participated in the league.
 Padideh Shandiz bought Mes Sarcheshmeh and came to the Azadegan League.
 Sang Ahan withdrew from participating in football. Estilae Kavir bought their license. Estilae Kavir was sponsored By Yazd Louleh Company and changed the name to Yazd louleh.

Changes during the season
 In middle of season the name Albadr was changed to Badr and Mohammad Rouyanian bought license of Saipa Shomal and changed the name to Persepolis Shomal.

Teams

Group A

Group B

Standings

Group A

Group B

Play-off

Final

Top scorers

Group A

Group B

References

External links
Group A - Stats and Players in PersianLeague
Group B - Stats and Players in PersianLeague

Azadegan League seasons
Iran
2013–14 in Iranian football leagues